Matić is a common Croatian or Serbian surname. It is a patronymic name of Mate, the Croatian, or Matija, both Croatian and Serbian variants of the Latin name Mathaeus, English Matthew.
According to Croatian-genealogy, the surname Matić is typically of Croat ethnicity, but it is carried by Serbian and Bosnian people as well.

Matić is the most common surname in the Dubrovnik-Neretva County in Croatia, and among the most frequent ones in another three counties.

Notable people with the name include:

 Bojan Matić (born 1991), Serbian footballer
 Darko Matić (born 1980), Bosnian-born Croatian footballer
 Dimitrije Matić (1821–1884), Serbian politician
 Dušan Matić (1898–1980), Serbian surrealist poet
 Igor Matić (born 1981), Serbian footballer
 Ivan Matić (born 1971), Croatian former footballer, now a manager
 Nemanja Matić (born 1988), Serbian footballer
 Peter Matić (1937–2019), Austrian actor and voice actor
 Saša Matić (born 1978), Bosnian Serb singer
 Stipe Matić (born 1979), Croatian footballer 
 Uroš Matić (born 1990), Serbian footballer 
 Veselin Matić (born 1960), Serbian basketball coach 
 Zoran Matić (born 1944), Yugoslav football coach

References

Slavic-language surnames
Croatian surnames
Serbian surnames
Patronymic surnames
Surnames from given names